Luis Meléndez (28 May 1900 – 3 March 1971) was a Spanish racewalker. He competed in the men's 10 kilometres walk at the 1920 Summer Olympics.

References

1900 births
1971 deaths
Athletes (track and field) at the 1920 Summer Olympics
Spanish male racewalkers
Olympic athletes of Spain
Place of birth missing